Cherry Hinton is a suburban area of the city of Cambridge, in the Cambridge district, in the county of Cambridgeshire, England.

History
The rectangular parish of Cherry Hinton occupies the western corner of Flendish hundred on the south-eastern outskirts of the city of Cambridge. (See Hundreds of Cambridgeshire.) In 1931 the parish had a population of 1254. On 1 April 1934 the parish was abolished and merged with Cambridge.

Pictures and a description of St Andrew's parish church appear at the Cambridgeshire Churches website.

There is an entry relating to Cherry Hinton in the Domesday Book:
"Hintone: Count Alan. 4 mills." (Alan Rufus
‘Alan the Red', one of the Counts of Brittany, confiscated Hinton Manor from Edith, the (so-called “common law”) first wife of Harold II of England — Edith Swanneck: 'Eddeva The Fair')

The War Ditches are the remains of an Iron Age hill fort (55 metres in diameter), now mostly lost to quarrying. (See Cherry Hinton Pit)

Geography 

The village itself is fairly compact. North of the village is Cambridge Airport; to the East is Fulbourn; to the South is Cherry Hinton Pit, a nature reserve formed from old chalk pits and then the Gog Magog Hills which rise to 75 metres. Outside the residential area the land is open farmland, with relatively few trees.

Demography 
Substantial housing estates, both local authority and private have been built in the village over the last 50 years.
Housing is typically suburban with 2,200 people per square kilometre; 40% of housing being semi-detached and 60% being owner-occupied.

In 2001 the population of the village was made up of 1,600 people under 16, 4,950 aged 16 to 59, and 1,750 over 60.

Economy
In common with changes in the post-war years most of the residents in employment work outside the village, in Cambridge and elsewhere. There are small industrial units scattered throughout the area, together with a thriving high-street with a selection of shops and small businesses. Marshall Aerospace, the aircraft maintenance company and owners of Cambridge Airport, to the north was a major employer in recent decades.

In 2001 the economically active population was estimated at 4,186 (70% of the population aged 16 to 74). Unemployment was given as 2.4%.

The village has three business areas: an industrial estate at the end of Coldham's Lane (between that and Church Lane) at the northern end of the High Street, and the Peterhouse Business park on the South-Eastern edge. The former site includes Inca Digital, Semitool, Storage King, and Carl Zeiss. The Peterhouse park includes the head office of the world-famous ARM processor designer, labs for the Human Nutrition Research Centre, and the head office of Cambridge Water. Lastly, Fulbourn Hospital (though not strictly within the village borders) is being redeveloped as a technology park, and houses many smaller companies, with offices of Illumina, Staffords, Syngeta, i2, Cambridge Light Technology, Boult Wade Tennant, Scientia, Ware Anthony Rust, and others.

Transport 
There are sufficient road links to Cambridge and the surrounding area; nearly 60% of the population travel to work by motorised vehicle and 25% travel to work by foot or bicycle; it takes 20 minutes to cycle into the centre of Cambridge at a moderate pace, 15 minutes to the railway station.

Cherry Hinton High Street has a long-standing traffic calming system consisting of a series of chicanes, traffic islands and mini roundabouts. Drivers seeking a through route can use Yarrow Road (around the eastern edge) instead.

There is a railway through the village but no extant station; the nearest railway stations are Cambridge itself (3 miles to the west), Shelford (3 miles to the south), and Dullingham (10 miles to the east). From Cambridge there are regular services to London Kings Cross, London Liverpool Street, King's Lynn (via Ely), Norwich (via Ely and via Stowmarket), Ipswich, and Peterborough (via Ely). Until the 1960s there was Fulbourn railway station at the far end of Fulbourn Village (sometimes called Fulbourne). In the 1850s, Cherryhinton railway station was open.

Cycle and footpaths 
Three non-road paths can be used to avoid motor traffic for part of these journeys. Daws Lane is a track leading from Sidney Farm Road to Snakey Path at a small bridge over Cherry Hinton Brook. The path heads west beside the brook until it reaches Burnside, which leads to Mill Road. Raised about 3' (1m) above water level the path is frequently used by cyclists and walkers. On the north side of the brook flooded chalk pits are visible. 

Another path, known as "The Tins", runs on the north side of the flooded chalk pits. It starts in Railway Street, cutting across Orchard Estate (where few houses still have the corrugated iron fences that give this path its name). Passing in front of the Holiday Inn and Norman Way it then passes over the railway on a footbridge and beside the Territorial Army centre. It meets Burnside somewhat closer to Mill Road than Snakey path, at the White Bridge.

There is also cycle path provision on various roads in the area, notably Cherry Hinton Road (linking with Hills Road), Fulbourn Road, Teversham Road, and Airport Way.

Buses
Citi 1 bus from Fulbourn to Arbury and the Citi 3 bus from Yarrow Road Tesco to Whitehill Estate/Fison Road combine for a frequency of a bus into the centre every 5 minutes, with an average journey time of approximately 20 minutes. Both services stop at the railway station and the Citi 1 additionally serves Addenbrooke's Hospital. A less frequent service (Citi 16/17) runs from St Andrew's Church at the end of Coldham's Lane to the Beehive Retail Park and into town.

Public services 

There are two health centres in the village, one of which (the Cherry Hinton Medical Centre) has a practice shared with Brookfields Health Centre on Seymour Street, Cambridge, the other (Cherry Hinton Surgery on High Street) is shared with "The Surgery" of Mill Road.

In the High Street there are a number of shops including a Tesco Express supermarket, a newsagent, Children's society charity shop, a Sue Ryder charity shop, a hairdresser, a barber, a bakery, two pharmacies, a cycle shop, a craft shop, two turf accountants and a post office. There is also a Tesco superstore towards Fulbourn. Meals are available at the Sitar Indian restaurant, Dominos Pizza, the Golden Pizza Chinese/Pizza Takeaway and the Cherry House Chinese Takeaway & Chip Shop, as well as from the bakery which provides a variety of filled rolls and hot snack products during the day.

There is a village hall and sports leisure centre (Cherry Hinton Village Leisure Centre) adjacent to the village library, with services currently operated by GLL on behalf of the City Council. The sports centre offers badminton, 5-a-side football, basketball as well as exercise classes and room hire. The village has a well-appointed recreation ground situated on the high street. Here children's play equipment, exercise equipment and football fields for local fixtures are provided. It also has a park and children's play area, including paddling pools and tennis courts, in the grounds of Cherry Hinton Hall, which hosts the internationally recognised annual Cambridge Folk Festival.

Cherry Hinton mostly falls within the jurisdiction of Cambridge City Council and Cambridgeshire County Council for Local Government Services although the easternmost parts are managed by South Cambs District Council.

Schools 
Cherry Hinton C of E Primary School is situated on the High Street just next to the level crossing and near to St Andrew's church. In September 2011, the school changed from an Infant School for children aged between 3 and 7 years to a Primary School for 3- to 11-year-old children. It is a Church School, founded by Trust Deed, and has 'Foundation' Governors, appointed by the Church of England. The school has been rated grade 2 ("good") school. Mary Waters, mother of Pink Floyd bass guitarist and lyricist Roger Waters, taught there during the 1960s and early 1970s.

Colville Primary School is situated on Colville Road.  It opened in the mid-1950s as a Junior School for 7 - 11 year-olds. 
Other primary schools, opened after the two above, include The Spinney Primary School, close to the village centre, and Bewick Bridge Community Primary School.

Secondary schooling for most children is at Netherhall School on the south west edge of the village, or alternatively at St Bede's Inter-Church School.

Independent schools in the village area include Oaks International School and Holme Court School.

Cultural references 
Fulbourn Hospital, to the East of Cherry Hinton was built as an asylum in the mid-19th century between the village and Fulbourn. Until recently the main Victorian building was used as a psychiatric hospital. It is this hospital which gave rise to the lines "Strong men have run for miles and miles, When one from Cherry Hinton smiles;" in the poem The Old Vicarage, Grantchester by Rupert Brooke.

The settlement of Cherry Hinton gave its name to the Cherry Hinton Stakes a horse race for two-year-old thoroughbred fillies. This Group Two event run over a distance of 6 furlongs (1,207 m) on the July Course at nearby Newmarket Racecourse in early July was renamed the Duchess of Cambridge Stakes in 2013.

See also 
 List of places in Cambridgeshire

References

External links 

 2001 Census
 Cherry Hinton History

Populated places in Cambridgeshire
Wards of Cambridge
Former civil parishes in Cambridgeshire